Between Salt and Sweet Water, also known as Drifting Upstream, is a 1967 Québécois film directed by Michel Brault, co-written by Brault, Gérald Godin, Marcel Dubé, Claude Jutra and Denys Arcand.

The film also features boxer Ronald Jones in a small role. Jones was one of the subjects of Gilles Groulx's 1961 documentary Golden Gloves.

Plot
Claude (Claude Gauthier) leaves his small town on the Côte-Nord to go to Montreal, where he works several odd jobs and eventually falls in love with Geneviève (Geneviève Bujold), a pretty waitress who works in a local diner. Claude enters a singing contest that launches his career. As he gradually becomes more well known, he has a brief affair with a married woman and breaks up with Geneviève. He returns to his hometown but nothing seems the same. Back in Montreal, he becomes increasingly more successful as a singer. One night he meets Geneviève backstage, only to learn she is now married, and realizes one can be as lonely in a small town as in a big city.

Cast

Additional information
This film has also been released under the following titles:
 - Canada (original title)
 - Austria (TV title) / East Germany (TV title) / West Germany (TV title)
Between Sweet and Salt Water - International (English title)
Drifting Upstream - Canada (English title)
 - Sweden

Reception
 is widely regarded as Michel Brault's most poetic and richly complex film.

The film was screened in the Director's Fortnight stream at the 1969 Cannes Film Festival.

References

External links

1967 films
Films set in Montreal
1960s French-language films
Films directed by Michel Brault
1967 drama films
French-language Canadian films
Canadian drama films
1960s Canadian films